KATE (1450 AM) is a radio station broadcasting a news/talk and oldies format. Licensed to Albert Lea, Minnesota, United States. The KATE 1450AM station serves the Albert Lea-Austin area. The station is currently owned by Alpha Media, through licensee Alpha 3E Licensee LLC Debtor-in-Possession and is licensed until 04/01/2021.

The KATE 1450AM main studio address is 1633 West Main Street, Albert Lea, Minnesota, 56007.

References

External links

Radio stations in Minnesota
News and talk radio stations in the United States
Radio stations established in 1986
1986 establishments in Minnesota
Alpha Media radio stations